Pakistan–Syria relations are the historic, international, and bilateral relations between Syria and Pakistan. Through the ancient civilization exchange, areas of modern Pakistan were part of the silk route with the Syria and for centuries, Syrian Islamic missionaries that introduced Islam in the parts of now integrated in Pakistan after 711 AD were from Syria.

Pakistan has raised its voice for the support for President Bashar al-Assad, and supports a peaceful solution of Syrian crises as well as opposing any military actions against Syria.

History

The regions comprising modern Syria and Pakistan have been under the rule of contiguous empires at various points in history, including during the reign of the Persian Empire, the conquests of Alexander the Great, Seleucid Empire and Sassanid Persia. However, the most influential impact was made during the duration of the Umayyad Caliphate, which stretched from Spain to India at its height and was centered at Damascus. The Indian provinces of the Caliphate corresponded to modern Sindh, Balochistan and southern Punjab, and during their administration, Indian (as well as Greek, Persian and Egyptian) craftsmen were conscripted to help construct the Great Mosque of Damascus.

Foreign relations

1960s–70s: Political relations
The foreign relations began to grow during the 1960s when Pakistan Armed Forces contingent were dispatched to Syria, specifically the fighter pilots to fly Syrian Air Force's Mig fighter jets.

In the 1970s, Syrian President Hafez al-Assad came to Pakistan to participate in the international Organization of Islamic Conference, being the first Syrian President to have visited Pakistan. Assad was believed to be a close ally of former Prime Minister Zulfikar Ali Bhutto. In a view of former statesman, Khurshid Kasuri, Pakistan's silence is a product of "historical links between the Bhutto and al-Assad families."  After the death of Zulfikar Ali Bhutto, Syrian President Hafez al-Assad ultimately awarded asylum to Benazir, Murtaza and Shahnavaz Bhutto in 1979 to support for their leftist campaign against President General Zia-ul-Haq.

Pakistan and the Yom Kippur War

In the events leading to the Yom Kippur War against Israel in 1973 which is usually referred to as the Ramadan War in Pakistan, a strong Pakistan military contingent was dispatched by Prime Minister Zulfiakr Bhutto to Syrian Armed Forces to help and to provide necessary military combat training, requested by Syrian President Hafez al-Assad. From 1973 to 1977, the Pakistan military advisers trained the Syrian Army personnel in various military tactics while maintaining a strong combat division to provide protection of Damascus from any possible Israeli Army attacks during the course of the war. The Pakistan Navy also played an active role in providing the naval hardware to Syrian navy while the PAF dispatched a sizable unit of its fighter pilots to fly the Syrian Air Force fighter jets, operating from Inchass field of Egyptian Air Force. The PAF wing led by Wing Commander Masood Hatif, the PAF and navy fighter pilots flew several of Syrian Air Forces' MiG 21 fighter jets and reportedly made aggressive patrols over Syrian-Israeli border.

In 1974, during the height of the conflict, one of the PAF's notable fighter pilot Flight-Lieutenant Sattar Alvi who flew Syrian Air Force's MiG-21, shot down IAF's Mirage-IIIC fighter jet which was piloted by Captain M. Lutz.  In other aerial engagement in following weeks in 1974, the  PAF fighter pilot, Squadron-Leader Arif Manzoor, leading a MiG-21 wing, forced two Israeli Mirages-IIIs into a close combat, and shooting down both Mirage IIIs with the K-13 missiles.  After the war, Flight Lieutenant Alvi and Squadron Leader Arif Manzoor were awarded two of Syria's highest decorations for gallantry awards in 1973 by President Hafez al-Assad in a public ceremony.

1970s–80s: Cooling and normalizing of relations
After the removal of Bhutto, Pakistan's relations with Syria had nose-dived after President Zia-ul-Haq assumed the control of the country in 1978.  In 1981, the relations deteriorated when the PIA commercial flight, Boeing 720, was hijacked by the operatives of al-Zulfikar in Damascus. The Pakistan government had long assessed that the al-Zulfikar had the enjoyed the support from the President Hafez al-Assad.

Tensions increased when Syria treated the hijackers as state guests, and the Foreign ministry delegation led by Major-General Rahim Khan was ill-treated.  The relations tensed until the next five years when the Foreign ministry successful negotiations normalized relations with Syria.  In 1987, President Zia-ul-Haq made a surprise state visit to Damascus and had a one-to-one meeting with President Hafez al-Assad to lead the discussion to normalize the relations.  Concerning about the political instability in Pakistan and suppression of left-wing alliance led by Benazir Bhutto, President al-Assad declared in audience: "Had Pakistan adopted Arabic, the language of the Quran, as the national language, the lingual rifts and political divisions and anarchy would not have occurred. Pakistan would have remained a united country."

After President Zia-ul-Haq's death and Benazir Bhutto becoming the Prime minister, the relations were warmed once again as Prime minister Benazir Bhutto promoted strong left-wing ideas and relations with Moscow.

1980s–2000s: Commerce, trade and education
In the 1990s, Syria successfully sought help from Pakistan to establish its own tractor factory in the country. Since the 1990s, Pakistan helped upgrade Syria's sugar, cement, fertilizer, and paper industry as well as cooperation has been increased in agriculture process.

Under a Pakistan Technical Assistance Programme (PTAP), Pakistan awards semester scholarships to Syrian students to study agriculture science at the University of Faisalabad; Pakistan also invested in establishing the institutes for computer science and informatics in Damascus in late 1990s. Since Benazir Bhutto and Pakistan Peoples Party (PPP) coming to power in 1993, the relations were warmed when Syria supported Pakistan's case for Kashmir and 
refers to the illegal Indian occupation of Eastern Kashmir as "an open aggression." However, Syria recognizes that Kashmir is a bilateral issue between India and Pakistan. After long negotiations, Pakistan and Syria have agreed for mutual cooperation and exchange of experts in the field of science and technology which led to the establishment of Pak-Syria Joint Committee on Science and Technology in 2005.

Moral and diplomatic support of Pakistan continued for Syria's position on Golan Heights in the UN after the Six-Day War. On annual basis, Pakistan exports a large cache of wheat and cotton to Syria on minimum prices in return for Syria providing crude oil to Pakistan at a lesser rates.

2010–present
In 2010, President Asif Zardari paid a state visit to Syria to meet with President Bashar al-Assad to expedite exchange of delegations in both government and private levels in political and economic sectors, eventually signing a trade treaty in 2010.

Ultimately after the start of the Syrian civil war, Pakistan adopted a policy of neutrality and pushed its non-belligerent role during the conflict.  Official stand of Pakistan keenly oppose the strong use of military strikes against Syria. At the meeting of the UNSC, Pakistan abstained from vote on an anti-Syria resolution in the UN General Assembly. Conference held by Iran, Pakistan urged the international community to respect Syria's sovereignty, independence and territorial integrity.

Pakistan has strongly urged the United States and western powers to avoid use of military force in Syria. In a statement, the Foreign Office spokesperson Aizaz Chaudhry maintained  that Syria's sovereignty and territorial integrity must be respected. Pakistan has greatly expressed deep concerns over the ongoing violence and threat of possible American military action looming large over already embattled Syria. The Pakistan Foreign ministry also strongly condemned the alleged use of chemical weapons of Syrian government, "All the engaged parties should adopt course of dialogue instead of violence and peaceful resolution of the conflict should be sought out", the Foreign Office quoted. The National Security Adviser, Sartaj Aziz, has quoted at the United Nations that: "Pakistan condemns the use of chemical weapons, but it does not support aerial strikes which the U.S. proposes as it will only make the situation "more concerning". Aziz strongly exhorted to the U.S and UK, "We should wait for the UN mission’s report on Syria."

On 17 February 2014, Islamabad stated its support for "the formation of a transitional governing body with full executive powers enabling it to take charge of the affairs of the country". The statement, which was made in the wake of a Saudi delegation's visit to Pakistan, was thought to suggest a policy shift although a Pakistani government official stated that there was no change in Pakistan's principle policy on Syria.

By December 2015, Pakistan foreign affairs stated that it is against any attempt to topple the government of Syrian President Bashar al-Assad.

By 2018, the Pakistan International School of Damascus, which is under the auspices of the Pakistani Embassy, has become a leading school in the country. In 2022, Shahid Akhtar was appointed as Ambassador Extraordinary and Plenipotentiary of Pakistan to Syria.

References

 
Syria
Bilateral relations of Syria